is a passenger railway station in located in the city of Yokkaichi,  Mie Prefecture, Japan, operated by the private railway operator Kintetsu Railway.

Lines
Ise-Matsumoto Station is served by the Yunoyama Line, and is located 2.8 rail kilometers from the terminus of the line at Kintetsu-Yokkaichi Station.

Station layout
The station consists of a single island platform, connected by a level crossing to the station building.

Platforms

Adjacent stations

History
It was renamed 
in 1926. On March 1, 1931 the station came under the ownership of the Mie Railway following a merger, and became part of Sanco following another merger on February 11, 1944. On February 1, 1964 the railway division of Sanco split off to form a separate company and the station came under the control of the Mie Electric Railway, which merged with Kintetsu on April 1, 1965.

Passenger statistics
In fiscal 2019, the station was used by an average of 1582 passengers daily (boarding passengers only).

Surrounding area
Mie Prefectural Road No. 8 Yokkaichi Suzuka Loop Line
Mie Prefectural Yokkaichi Commercial High School
Yokkaichi Matsumoto Post Office

See also
List of railway stations in Japan

References

External links

 Kintetsu: Ise-Matsumoto Station

Railway stations in Japan opened in 1913
Railway stations in Mie Prefecture
Yokkaichi